General Carey may refer to:

George Glas Sandeman Carey (1867–1948), British Army major general
George Jackson Carey (1822–1872), British Army major general
Henry Carey, 1st Baron Hunsdon (1526–1596), captain general to Queen Elizabeth
Joel Carey (fl. 2010s–2020s), U.S. Air Force brigadier general
Michael Carey (United States Air Force officer) (born 1960), U.S. Air Force major general
Richard E. Carey (born 1928), U.S. Marine Corps lieutenant general
Robert Carey (British Army officer) (1821–1883), British Army major general